The Consulate General of the Philippines in Barcelona is a diplomatic mission of the Republic of the Philippines in Spain, representing the country's interests in Catalonia. It is located on the first floor of the  along the Rambla de Catalunya in the Eixample district of Barcelona, near major landmarks like the Galeria Mayoral and the Coliseum. Although the current consulate dates from 2020, the Philippines also maintained a previous consulate in Barcelona between 2008 and 2012.

History
The Philippine Consulate General in Barcelona was first opened on Independence Day, June 12, 2008, with Eduardo José de Vega serving as its first consul general. At its inauguration, Foreign Affairs Secretary Alberto Romulo noted that the mission's opening built on momentum arising from the 2007 state visit of President Gloria Macapagal Arroyo to Spain, highlighting the deepening relationship between the two countries.

After a massive expansion of the Philippines' diplomatic presence abroad during the Arroyo presidency, in 2010 Senator Franklin Drilon questioned the need for embassies in countries with small Filipino communities, including a number of countries in Europe, and called for a review of the Philippines' diplomatic presence worldwide. This would lead to the closure of ten posts under Arroyo's successor, Benigno Aquino III, and ultimately to the closure of the consulate general on July 31, 2012. The closure was not without controversy: in January 2012, over 4,000 Filipinos from the local community – at the time around one-fifth of all Filipinos within the mission's service area – organized on Facebook to protest the DFA's decision. A petition was also organized alongside similar movements in other affected countries, with some 1,000 signatures being gathered in Barcelona on its first day.

While the consulate general remained closed, relations were conducted through an honorary consulate, initially headed by businessman Jordi Puig. Puig would continue to serve as honorary consul until he was dismissed after participating in a pro-Catalan independence general strike on October 3, 2017, with the DFA ending his term six months early on January 31, 2018. Puig was subsequently replaced by lawyer Chona T. Abiertas, an ethnic Filipino, who assumed the position on May 26, 2018.

By 2017, the Philippine government had begun considering reopening the consulate general, spurred by the House of Representatives passing a resolution calling on the DFA to reopen it. Two years later, Foreign Affairs Secretary Teodoro Locsin Jr. announced that the consulate general would reopen as part of an expansion of the country's diplomatic presence under Aquino's successor, Rodrigo Duterte, and the consulate general finally reopened on March 2, 2020. Initially located along the Gran Via de les Corts Catalanes, it moved to its permanent location along the Rambla de Catalunya on September 1, 2020.

Staff and activities
The Philippine Consulate General in Barcelona is headed by Consul General Maria Theresa S.M. Lazaro, who assumed the position on March 27, 2021. Prior to this current post, Lazaro, a career diplomat who has been with the Philippine foreign service since 2000, served as the Executive Director of the DFA's Office of Consular Affairs, and was also previously deployed to the embassies in London and Bern.

Currently, the consulate general's jurisdiction covers Catalonia, Aragon, the Balearic Islands, and the Valencian Community, in addition to the independent country of Andorra. Some 25,000 Filipinos live within its service area, with the Philippines also being the only Southeast Asian country to maintain a career consulate general in Barcelona.

See also
List of diplomatic missions of the Philippines
List of diplomatic missions in Spain

References

External links

Official website of the Philippine Consulate General in Barcelona

Barcelona
Philippines
Philippines–Spain relations